Gary Turner (born 2 September 1970) is an English professional mixed martial artist who fought in the Cage Rage and K-1 promotions. Turner was the K-1 UK Grand Prix champion in 2003 and 2004. As a mixed martial artist, he currently holds a record of 4-2-1 with notable victories over Tank Abbott and former British Heavyweight boxing champion, Julius Francis.

Mixed martial arts career

Turner made his professional MMA debut in 1999 with a win over Joe Akano. After fighting once more seven months later Turner did not fight in a professional MMA again until 2007 when he joined Cage Rage. On 21 April 2007, he made his Cage Rage debut against American former UFC fighter Tank Abbott which he won by TKO after 2:31 of the opening round.

He continued with Cage Rage, winning his next two fights against Brazilian Edson Drago and former British heavyweight boxer Julius Francis before suffering his first defeat against Mostapha Al-turk by submission in March 2008 which was to be his final fight in Cage Rage as the promotion folded at the end of 2008. His last MMA was in April 2009, losing a split decision to Valdas Pocevicius in Croatia.

Titles

Gary is a 10-time world champion (x2 kickboxing, x8 Ju-Jitsu) who has also won countless European and domestic titles across a wide range of martial arts styles.

Pro Kickboxing
2006 W.P.K.C. super heavyweight world champion +95 kg (K-1 Rules)
2005 K-1 Scandinavia Grand Prix runner up
2004 K-1 Battle of Britain champion
2003 K-1 Battle of Britain champion
1997 W.A.K.O. Pro heavyweight European champion -94 kg (Full-Contact)
1996 W.A.K.O. Pro super cruiserweight British champion -88 kg (Low-Kick)
1995 W.K.A. super cruiserweight British champion -90 kg (Full-Contact)
1995 W.A.K.O. Pro heavyweight British champion -94 kg (Low-Kick)

Amateur Kickboxing
1997 W.A.K.O. World Championships in Gdansk, Poland  (Full-Contact)
1996 W.A.K.O. European Championships in Belgrade, Serbia & Montenegro  -91 kg (Full-Contact)
1994 W.A.K.O. European Championships in Helsinki, Finland  (Full-Contact)
1992 W.A.K.O. European Championships in Varna, Bulgaria  (Light-Contact)

Ju-Jitsu
2001 W.C.J.J.O. World Championships in Jersey, UK  (Teams)
2001 W.C.J.J.O. World Championships in Jersey, UK  (Individual)
2000 I.S.J.A. World Championships in Leeds, UK  (Teams)
2000 I.S.J.A. World Championships in Leeds, UK  (Individual)
1999 J.J.I.F. European Championships in Leeds, UK 
1998 J.J.I.F. World Championships in Berlin, Germany 
1998 W.C.J.J.O. World Championships in Reno, USA  (Teams)
1998 W.C.J.J.O. World Championships in Reno, USA  (Individual)
1998 I.S.J.A. World Championships in Vancouver, Canada  (Teams)
1998 I.S.J.A. World Championships in Vancouver, Canada  (Individual)
1997 J.J.I.F. European Championships in Paris, France  
1996 I.S.J.A. World Championships in West Virginia, USA  (Teams)
1996 I.S.J.A. World Championships in West Virginia, USA  (Individual)
1995 W.C.J.J.O. World Championships in Auckland, New Zealand  (Teams)
1995 W.C.J.J.O. World Championships in Auckland, New Zealand  (Individual)

Judo
1996 British Schools champion

Shootfighting
1992 Golden Dragon Cup in Rimini, Italy tournament champion

Professional kickboxing record 

|-
|-  bgcolor="#FFBBBB"
| 2008-10-05 || Loss ||align=left| Tyrone Spong || K.O. Events "Tough Is Not Enough" || Rotterdam, Netherlands || TKO (Doc Stop) || 1 || 1:05
|-
|-  bgcolor="#CCFFCC"
| 2006-12-08 || Win ||align=left| Samir Seif || Shin Do Kumaté XI || Tampa, FL, USA || Decision || 3 || 3:00
|-
|-  bgcolor="#c5d2ea"
| 2006-09-09 || Draw ||align=left| Rick Roufus || Shin Do Kumaté X || Tampa, FL, USA || Decision Draw || 3 || 3:00
|-
|-  bgcolor="#CCFFCC"
| 2006-03-03 || Win ||align=left| Carter Williams || Arnold Schwarzenegger Classic 2006 || Columbus, OH, USA || Decision (Unanimous) || 5 || 3:00
|-
|-  bgcolor="#CCFFCC"
| 2005-10-29 || Win ||align=left| Gregory Tony || K-1 New Talents 2005 in Germany || Koblenz, Germany || TKO (Corner Stop) || 3 || 3:00
|-
|-  bgcolor="#CCFFCC"
| 2005-09-24 || Win ||align=left| Azem Maksutaj || Fight Night Winterthur || Winterthur, Switzerland || Decision (Unanimous) || 5 || 3:00
|-
! style=background:white colspan=9 |
|-
|-  bgcolor="#FFBBBB"
| 2005-05-21 || Loss ||align=left| Bjorn Bregy || K-1 Scandinavia GP '05, Final || Stockholm, Sweden || Decision (Unanimous) || 3 || 3:00
|-
! style=background:white colspan=9 |
|-
|-  bgcolor="#CCFFCC"
| 2005-05-21 || Win ||align=left| Wisam Feyli || K-1 Scandinavia GP '05, Semi Final || Stockholm, Sweden || Decision (Split) || 3 || 3:00
|-
|-  bgcolor="#CCFFCC"
| 2005-05-21 || Win ||align=left| Topi Helin || K-1 Scandinavia GP '05, Quarter Final || Stockholm, Sweden || Decision (Split) || 3 || 3:00
|-
|-  bgcolor="#FFBBBB"
| 2004-12-12 || Loss ||align=left| Badr Hari || Rings Fightgala "Born Invincible" || Utrecht, Netherlands || Decision (Unanimous) || 5 || 3:00
|-
|-  bgcolor="#CCFFCC"
| 2004-04-24 || Win ||align=left| Daniel Waciakowski || Pain and Glory || Birmingham, England, UK || TKO || 2 ||
|-
|-  bgcolor="#CCFFCC"
| 2004-02-22 || Win ||align=left| Nick Sheppard || K-1 Battle of Britain 2004, Final || Wolverhampton, England, UK || KO (Leg Kick) || 1 ||
|-
! style=background:white colspan=9 |
|-
|-  bgcolor="#CCFFCC"
| 2004-02-22 || Win ||align=left| James Zikic || K-1 Battle of Britain 2004, Semi Final || Wolverhampton, England, UK || Ext.R Decision || 4 || 3:00
|-
|-  bgcolor="#CCFFCC"
| 2004-02-22 || Win ||align=left| Steve Jones || K-1 Battle of Britain 2004, Quarter Final || Wolverhampton, England, UK || TKO (Corner Stop) || 2 ||
|-
|-  bgcolor="#FFBBBB"
| 2003-08-20 || Loss ||align=left| Alexander Ustinov || K-1 Spain GP '03, Semi Final || Barcelona, Spain || Decision (Unanimous) || 3 || 3:00
|-
|-  bgcolor="#CCFFCC"
| 2003-08-20 || Win ||align=left| Daniel Perez || K-1 Spain GP '03, Quarter Final || Barcelona, Spain || Decision (Unanimous) || 3 || 3:00
|-
|-  bgcolor="#FFBBBB"
| 2003-05-30 || Loss ||align=left| Bjorn Bregy || K-1 World GP '03 Basel, Semi Final || Basel, Switzerland || Decision || 3 || 3:00
|-
|-  bgcolor="#CCFFCC"
| 2003-05-30 || Win ||align=left| Hasan Kuzucular || K-1 World GP '03 Basel, Reserve Fight || Basel, Switzerland || KO || 2 ||
|-
|-  bgcolor="#CCFFCC"
| 2003-04-13 || Win ||align=left| Gordon Minors || K-1 World GP '03 Prelim. UK, Final || Birmingham, England, UK || TKO (Doc Stop) || 1 || 0:15
|-
! style=background:white colspan=9 |
|-
|-  bgcolor="#CCFFCC"
| 2003-04-13 || Win ||align=left| Simon Dimitrious || K-1 World GP '03 Prelim. UK, Semi Final || Birmingham, England, UK || Decision || 3 || 3:00
|-
|-  bgcolor="#CCFFCC"
| 2003-04-13 || Win ||align=left| Kenny Gayle || K-1 World GP '03 Prelim. UK, Quarter Final || Birmingham, England, UK || Decision || 3 || 3:00
|-
|-  bgcolor="#CCFFCC"
| 2002-11-17 || Win ||align=left| Rob Lloyd || K-1 UK MAX 2002, Super Fight || Birmingham, England, UK || Decision || 5 || 3:00
|-
|-  bgcolor="#FFBBBB"
| 2002-03-24 || Loss ||align=left| Mark Russell || K-1 World GP '02 Prelim. UK, Quarter Final || Birmingham, England, UK || Decision (Majority) || 3 || 3:00
|-
|-  bgcolor="#FFBBBB"
| 2001-?-? || Loss ||align=left| Augusto Sparano || Trieste Sport Show || Trieste, Italy || Decision || 12 || 2:00
|-
! style=background:white colspan=9 |
|-
|-  bgcolor="#CCFFCC"
| 2000-11-19 || Win ||align=left| Tyrone Herod || K-1 UK Global Heat 2000 || Birmingham, England, UK || Decision || 3 || 3:00
|-
|-  bgcolor="#FFBBBB"
| 2000-04-16 || Loss ||align=left| Matt Skelton || K-1 UK Battle of Britain 2000, Quarter Final || Birmingham, England, UK || Decision (Unanimous) || 3 || 3:00
|-
|-  bgcolor="#FFBBBB"
| 2000-?-? || Loss ||align=left| || || Cyprus || Decision || 10 || 2:00
|-
! style=background:white colspan=9 |
|-
|-  bgcolor="#CCFFCC"
| 1997-?-? || Win ||align=left| Tacci Edhem || || Macedonia || Decision || 5 || 2:00
|-
|-  bgcolor="#CCFFCC"
| 1997-?-? || Win ||align=left| Leroy Tomski || || England, UK || KO || 2 ||
|-
! style=background:white colspan=9 |
|-
|-  bgcolor="#c5d2ea"
| 1997-?-? || Draw ||align=left| Gordon Minors || || England, UK || Decision Draw || 7 || 2:00
|-
! style=background:white colspan=9 |
|-
|-  bgcolor="#CCFFCC"
| 1996-?-? || Win ||align=left| Lee Swaby || || England, UK || Decision || 7 || 3:00
|-
! style=background:white colspan=9 |
|-
|-  bgcolor="#CCFFCC"
| 1996-?-? || Win ||align=left| Ian Morgan || || England, UK || KO || 2 ||
|-
|-  bgcolor="#CCFFCC"
| 1995-?-? || Win ||align=left| Ricky Nicholson || || England, UK || Decision || 7 || 2:00
|-
! style=background:white colspan=9 |
|-
|-  bgcolor="#CCFFCC"
| 1995-?-? || Win ||align=left| Ian Morgan || || England, UK || TKO || 2 ||
|-
! style=background:white colspan=9 |
|-
|-  bgcolor="#FFBBBB"
| 1994-?-? || Loss ||align=left| Kevin Morton ||  || England, UK || Decision || 10 || 2:00
|-
! style=background:white colspan=9 |
|-
|-  bgcolor="#CCFFCC"
| 1991-?-? || Win ||align=left| Richard Smith || || England, UK || KO || 2 ||
|-
|-
| colspan=9 | Legend:

Mixed martial arts record

|-
| Loss
| align=center| 4-2-1
| Valdas Pocevicius
| Decision (split)
| NG 4: Noc Gladiatora 4
| 
| align=center| 3
| align=center| 5:00
| Dubrovnik, Croatia
| 
|-
| Loss
| align=center| 4-1-1
| Mostapha al-Turk
| TKO (submission to punches)
| Cage Rage 25
| 
| align=center| 1
| align=center| 3:19
| London, England
| 
|-
| Win
| align=center| 4-0-1
| Julius Francis
| TKO (submission to punches)
| Cage Rage 23
| 
| align=center| 2
| align=center| 2:17
| London, England
| 
|-
| Win
| align=center| 3-0-1
| Edson Claas Vieira
| TKO (corner stoppage)
| Cage Rage 22
| 
| align=center| 2
| align=center| 5:00
| London, England
| 
|-
| Win
| align=center| 2-0-1
| Tank Abbott
| TKO (punches)
| Cage Rage 21
| 
| align=center| 1
| align=center| 2:31
| London, England
| 
|-
| Draw
| align=center| 1-0-1
| Lee MacGuinness
| Draw
| Total Fight KRG 5
| 
| align=center| 2
| align=center| 5:00
| Buckinghamshire, England
| 
|-
| Win
| align=center| 1-0
| Joe Akano
| KO
| Night of the Samurai 3
| 
| align=center| 2
| align=center| N/A
| Milton Keynes, England
|

References

External links

Professional MMA record
Official website

1970 births
Living people
English male kickboxers
Heavyweight kickboxers
English male mixed martial artists
Heavyweight mixed martial artists
Mixed martial artists utilizing Muay Thai
Mixed martial artists utilizing shootfighting
Mixed martial artists utilizing jujutsu
Mixed martial artists utilizing judo
English male judoka
English jujutsuka
English Muay Thai practitioners